Punan Merah is a Punan language of East Kalimantan, Indonesia, one of several spoken by the Punan people.

References

Languages of Indonesia
Punan languages